Torchi is a surname. Notable people with the surname include:

Angiolo Torchi (1856–1915), Italian painter
Luigi Torchi (1812–?), Italian inventor
Luigi Torchi (musician) (1858–1920), Italian musicologist